River Beat is a 1954 British noir crime film directed by Guy Green and starring John Bentley, Phyllis Kirk and Leonard White. The screenplay concerns a river police inspector who faces a moral dilemma when a woman he knows gets caught up in jewel smuggling. It was shot at Walton Studios and on location around London. The film's sets were designed by the art director John Stoll. It was produced as a second feature and distributed in the United States by Lippert Pictures.

Plot
Judy (Phyllis Kirk) is a radio operator on an American ship duped into smuggling diamonds in the belief that she was delivering cigarettes. Stopped by Customs she is in further trouble when the man who involved her is found dead in the river. Customs Detective Dan Barker (John Bentley), who has fallen for Judy has to find out whether she is guilty or innocent and protect her from the smuggling gang, especially if they think she is “going to talk”.

Cast

  John Bentley as Detective Inspector Dan Barker
  Phyllis Kirk as Judy Roberts
  Robert Ayres as Watford
  Leonard White as Detective Sergeant Mack McLeod
  Glyn Houston as Charlie Williamson
  Patrick Jordan as Bert Fisher
  Ewan Roberts as Customs Inspector J.S. Blake
  David Hurst as Paddy McClure
  Charles Lloyd-Pack as John Hendrick
  Isabel George as Anna
  Margaret Anderson as Nell, Charlie's girl
  Harold Ayer as Joseph Benson, alias Alfred Gordon
  Tony Hilton as Harry, the bartender
 Jack McNaughton as 	Hickson
 Dermot Palmer	as	Wayne
  Colin Douglas as Harbor Patrol superintendent
  Bill Nagy as Eddie, deckhand
  Michael Browning as Detective Perry
  Michael Balfour as Adams, sailor
  Peter Collingwood as Surgeon
 Warwick Ashton as Constable
 	Eric Corrie as Constable

Reception
Variety said "The programmer market, currently short of passable supporting filmfare, will find this London-localed melodrama an acceptable filler... Miss Kirk provides a casting 
switch to the Anglo-American film efforts Lippert usually releases. Heretofore it has been an American male in England, and mixed up with Scotland Yard and British crooks... The plotting is contrived and everything drops too patly into place as the 70 minutes unfold." The film critic Dennis Schwartz called it "a decent adventure film involving ruthless smugglers" and noted the "great location shooting in London, a taut screenplay by Rex Rientis, and a fine acting performance by the American Phyllis Kirk."

References

Bibliography
 Chibnall, Steve & McFarlane, Brian. The British 'B' Film. Palgrave MacMillan, 2009.

External links
 
 River Beat at BFI
 River Beat at Letterbox DVD
 River Beat at TCMDB

1954 films
British crime drama films
1954 crime drama films
1950s English-language films
Films directed by Guy Green
Seafaring films
Films set in London
Films shot in London
Films shot at Nettlefold Studios
British black-and-white films
Eros Films films
Lippert Pictures films
1950s British films